Beeper is a 2002 American crime thriller film directed by Jack Sholder.

The thriller Beeper concerns a doctor working in India whose son is kidnapped. Left with nothing more but the title device as a way to communicate with the kidnappers, the man must make his way through the seedy underground in order to rescue his son. Among the people he must team up with are

A drug dealer called Zolo (Harvey Keitel) helps Dr. Richard Avery find his kidnapped son. The kidnappers contact him using only a beeper.

Cast
 Harvey Keitel as Zolo
 Joey Lauren Adams as Inspector Julia Hyde
 Ed Quinn as Dr. Richard Avery
 Gulshan Grover as Sr. Inspector Vijay Kumar
 Stefan Djordjevic as Sam Avery
 Vinay Varma as Tiger

Reception
Scott Weinberg of DVDTalk.com gave it 2.5 out of 5 and suggested "Should it pop up on cable one insomniatic evening and you can watch it without dropping any money, sure, give Beeper a spin and see if it works for you."

References

External links
 

2002 films
2002 crime thriller films
American crime thriller films
Films directed by Jack Sholder
Films scored by J. Peter Robinson
2000s English-language films
2000s American films